The 1950-51 Australians defeated the touring England team 4-1 in the 1950-51 Ashes series, Australia's last Ashes success until 1958-59. The series was tilted the balance from the powerful Australian teams of the 1940s to the strong England teams of the 1950s. While in the end they won easily the team made heavy weather of defeating a weak touring team and would lose the next three hard-fought Ashes series. The newly knighted Sir Donald Bradman had retired from cricket, but most of his great 1948 Australian team still played and Australia had not lost a Test series since 1932-33.

Unbeaten Run
At the fifteenth attempt since the war we won at Melbourne...It was then that I felt that the great Australian team was just beginning to deteriorate. The quality of the Test sides usually runs in cycles. A number of the batsmen who scored heavily on previous occasions found that Don Bradman had not spent hours at the wicket softening the bowling, and run-scoring against bowlers who were not tired was not so easy.
Alec Bedser
When they were defeated in the Fifth Test it ended their unbeaten run of 14 Tests against England, 26 Tests against all countries and 96 games in all cricket, having lost their last game to England at the Oval in 1938. Their record remained until England played 27 Tests without defeat in 1968-71. 
1-0 (1 Test)  in New Zealand 1945-46
3-0 (5 Tests) vs England 1946-47.
4-0 (5 Tests) vs India in 1947–48
4-0 (5 Tests) in England in 1948.
4-0 (5 Tests) in South Africa in 1949-50
4-1 (5 Tests) vs England in 1950-51, England winning the Fifth Test at Melbourne by 8 wickets.

The Captain
Hassett played to win, to the last inch and the last second. If he could not do that, he set out to prevent the other fellows from winning. Yet, if defeat was inevitable, he could take it as well as anybody.
Keith Miller

Lindsay Hassett had been Don Bradman's vice-captain in 1948, but his rise to the captaincy was not certain despite his seniority and talent. Australian cricket swung around the twin poles of Victoria and New South Wales who dominated the Sheffield Shield. Hassett was captain of Victoria and his rival Arthur Morris was captain of New South Wales, with some board members being biased against Hassett's Irish Catholic background, he only received the post by the barest of margins (7-6). Hassett was 37 by the 1950-51 season and Morris was tipped to lead the 1953 tour of England, but remained vice-captain to Hassett and his Victorian successor Ian Johnson and only led Australia in two Tests in their absence (which he both lost). Hassett himself was a dimulative (5'6") batsman who had been a great strokemaker before the war and had made his Test debut in England in 1938. He performed well for the Australian Services cricket team and in the Victory Tests against England in 1945. After the war he took his batting more seriously and was more defensive, though never dull, and he never failed in a series. He had an impish good humour, but as captain tended to become serious on the field. Although a keen tactician he lacked the aggressiveness and self-confidence of Bradman, but then he also lacked Bradman's batting and Hassett would see Australia overshadowed by the strong England teams of the mid-1950s.

Batting
One of Lindsay Hassett's biggest problems in the series just completed against Brown's team was to attempt the impossible and hide his fear of losing a wicket. In each and every Test match Alec Bedser exposed the Australian weakness, and young Neil Harvey was sacrificed in an attempt to keep the bad news from the crowds.
John Kay

The only weakness that could be seen in the Australian team was their batting, Don Bradman (99.94), Sid Barnes (63.05) and Bill Brown (46.82) had all retired and had not been fully replaced. The vice-captain Arthur Morris (46.48) was labeled "Bedser's Bunny" as the English bowler dismissed him easily in the first three Tests, but he made 168 and 105 against the tourists for New South Wales and 100 for an Australian XI. He finally laid the bunny to rest with his highest Test century in the Fourth Test at Adelaide, making 206 out of 371. The real trouble was finding him a suitable opening partner as Jack Moroney made a pair, Ken Archer never made a Test 50 and Jim Burke failed when promoted after making an unbeaten century on his Test debut. It was a problem that was not solved and Lindsay Hassett took to opening the batting in 1953 and Morris had another succession of partners in 1954-55. Neil Harvey (48.42) was still a baby-faced youngster in 1950-51, committed to strokeplay regardless of the situation. He had a steady series and initially came in at number 3 before being moved down to his natural position at number 4. Lindsay Hassett replaced him and the Australian captain made more runs than anybody else in the team, but failed to make a century. However, he did have strength in depth, Keith Miller (36.97) and Ray Lindwall (21.15) were all-rounders of Test class, Miller topped the Australian batting averages and was the only man who could - briefly - take the attack to the accurate bowling of Alec Bedser and Trevor Bailey. Sam Loxton (36.93) was a big-hitting all-rounder, but his bowling days were behind him and was used as a middle order batsmen, without success. Ian Johnson was a useful tailender who could have been a fully-fledged all rounder with greater application and made 77 in the Third Test at Sydney. Don Tallon was a useful lower-order batsmen in 1948, but failed in all the Tests and his increasing deafness made him a poor runner. Bill Johnston was an awkward batsmen who could be difficult to remove, but the last man was Jack Iverson "...whose batting pretensions are possibly no higher than those of a third-grade schoolboy player".

Bowling
Iverson's final figures were the magnificent ones of 19.4-8-27-6, and never have I seen a bowler so completely on top of batsmen, length, spin and flight all being allied in perfect formation to produce a performance bearing the stamp of genius. Those who belittled this Victoria man, who learned to bowl his spinners in an unorthodox manner during the war years, were now forced to admit that Australia had found another bowling trump card.
John Kay

The home side were still able to call on the bowlers of Don Bradman's Great 1948 Team; the hostile pace of Ray Lindwall (23.03) and Keith Miller (22.97), the left-arm swing and left arm spin of Bill Johnston (23.91), the flighted off-spinners of Ian Johnson and the mystery spin of Jack Iverson. Ray Lindwall was regarded as the finest fast bowler after the war, with a perfectly controlled action; "he appears to be just jogging his fifteen yards up to the stumps - until the last couple of strides of his approach, when he suddenly explodes into his delivery stride...when he releases the ball, his bowling arm is so low that it borders on the round-arm". He had had a mixed tour of South Africa in 1949-50, failing to take a wicket in the first three South African innings and being dropped for the last Test, his form suffering from groin strain, fibrositis and a stomach disorder. This led to speculation that at 29 the fast bowler's career might soon be over as "his pace was not what it was by any means, and his arm is much lower...his action is more laboured and his body does not follow through". Lindwall returned to the team and would bowl for Australia throughout the 1950s, though Lindsay Hassett tended to underuse him in the series, the opposite of Bradman who overbowled him. Keith Miller was the "glamour boy" of the Australian team "his batting was a joy to behold, his fast bowling can be both fascinating to watch and deadly in effect, while his fielding in the slips and in the covers is feline in its anticipation and soundness". There was  a national outcry when he was not picked for the South Africa tour, both as the mercurial all rounder didn't want to bowl (his back had in injured when a night-fighter pilot in the Second World War), not helped by his well-known antipathy with the new Test selector Don Bradman, but was later flown out as a replacement. "Big Bill" Johnston was a powerful left-arm swing bowler who would be Australia's best wicket-taker in the series despite the fame of Lindwall and Miller. Like Miller he could bowl spin, but instead of mixing his bowling he saved his slow left arm spinners for when the opposition were caught on a sticky wicket. Ian Johnson was an off-spinner, a rarity in Australian cricket which tended to prefer leg-spinners. He was not a big turner of the ball, and one of the slowest bowlers in cricket, but he used flight to deceive the batsmen and tied down one end while the fast bowlers rested. To these veterans could be added the extraordinary mystery spin of Jack Iverson, who had found that he could use his long middle finger to turn the ball either way when whiling away the hours in the New Guinea campaign. Although never more than an occasional Grade cricketer before the war Iverson perfected his art and was chosen to play for his native Victoria in 1949-50, but was on the verge of quitting cricket when the England team arrived. He was 35 and his ailing father needed him to take over the family business, but stayed at the helm against his doctor's advice so that Iverson could play for Australia. He took 3/85 for Victoria vs the tourists and though he only dismissed three tailenders he caused the batsmen enough trouble to be picked for the Test team and the First Test at Brisbane was the first Test match he ever saw. His greatest day came in the Third Test at Sydney when he took 6/27 in Australia's innings victory. He retired at the end of the season even though he had "the world's best batsmen at his mercy, if he could spare the time".

Fielding
His fielding was almost a minus quality. Hassett would be saddled with the difficult task of hiding him away from busy corners all day long. But the fielding of the team as a whole was thought to be brittle. Moroney...would never be accused of being a mobile unit of the out-cricket, and Ian Johnson was, in my opinion, anyhow, a very doubtful quantity especially as a slip-fieldsman, where he seemed likely to do duty...I sympathized with Hassett over the big job he faced in getting good fielding done with the quality of the manpower as his disposal. There were only five good fieldsmen in the group of twelve chosen. These were Harvey, Miller, Morris, Loxton and Archer, and Archer was the supernumerary.
Bill O'Reilly

Queensland's Don Tallon was reaching the end of his career, but despite his poor performances managed to hold his place against his rivals Gil Langley and Ron Saggers even though he had missed the tour South Africa in 1949-50. He took only 8 catches in the 5 Test series, missed every stumping chance and only satisfied his critics in the Third Test at Sydney. Otherwise the Australians were usually far superior to the England side in the field - the 1953 Australians were considered to be the best fielding team ever to tour England - and they trained hard to improve their performance. Neil Harvey was an outstanding in the covers, Ian Johnson was considered to be one of the best slip fielders in the world and Keith Miller and Sam Loxton were good catchers of the ball in any position.

The Australian Team

First Test – Brisbane

See Main Article - 1950-51 Ashes series

Second Test – Melbourne

See Main Article - 1950-51 Ashes series

Third Test – Sydney

See Main Article - 1950-51 Ashes series

Fourth Test – Adelaide

See Main Article - 1950-51 Ashes series

Fifth Test – Melbourne

See Main Article - 1950-51 Ashes series

References
Ashes Australian Cricket team 2017/18

Bibliography
 John Arlott, John Arlott's 100 Greatest Batsmen, MacDonald Queen Anne Press, 1986
 John Kay, Ashes to Hassett, A review of the M.C.C. tour of Australia, 1950-51, John Sherratt & Son, 1951
 W.J. O'Reilly, Cricket Task-Force, The Story of the 1950-51 Australian Tour, Werner Laurie, 1951
 E.W. Swanton, Swanton in Australia with MCC 1946-1975, Fontana/Collins, 1975

Further reading
 Peter Arnold, The Illustrated Encyclopedia of World Cricket, W. H. Smith, 1985
 Ashley Brown, The Pictorial History of Cricket, Bison, 1988
 Bill Frindall, The Wisden Book of Test Cricket 1877-1978, Wisden, 1979
 Tom Graveney and Norman Miller, The Ten Greatest Test Teams  Sidgewick and Jackson, 1988
 Gideon Haigh, Mystery Spinner: The Story of Jack Iverson, Aurum Press Ltd, 2002
 Chris Harte, A History of Australian Cricket, Andre Deutsch, 1993
 Keith Miller, Cricket Crossfire, Oldbourne Press, 1956
 Ray Robinson, On Top Down Under, Cassell, 1975
 E.W. Swanton (ed), Barclay's World of Cricket, Willow, 1986
 Wisden Cricketers' Almanack 1951, "MCC in Australia and New Zealand, 1954-55"

1950 in Australian cricket
1951 in Australian cricket
Australian cricket seasons from 1945–46 to 1969–70